Larry Edward Metz (born March 20, 1955) is an American judge and former politician from Florida. He has served on the Fifth Judicial Circuit Court since June 30, 2018. Previously, he was a Republican member of the Florida House of Representatives  from 2012 until his appointment as judge.

History

Metz was born in Abington, Pennsylvania, and moved to the state of Florida in 1968. He then attended the University of Florida, where he graduated with a Bachelor's degree in 1976. After graduation, Metz took graduate-level courses in public administration at San Diego State University, but did not graduate, instead attending the Florida State University College of Law, where he received a Juris Doctor in 1983. From 1976 to 1980, he served in the United States Marine Corps, and he was stationed in Japan for a year during that time, where he met his wife, Mariko. From 1980 to 1982, while in law school, he remained in the United States Marine Corps Reserve. In 1983 he began private practice as an attorney, eventually starting Metz Law Firm, P.A. In 1992, Metz ran for Congress against incumbent Democratic Congressman Harry Johnston in the newly created 19th District, but he lost to Johnston, receiving only 37% of the vote. When State Representative Carey Baker opted to run for the Florida Senate rather than seek re-election in the 25th District, which included northern Lake County and a few segments in northern Seminole County and southern Volusia County, Metz ran to succeed him in 2004. He faced Alan Hays, Johnny Barto Smith, Randy Wiseman, and JoAnn Huggins in the Republican primary. Ultimately, Metz narrowly lost to Hays, winning 29% of the vote to Hays's 35%. Later that year, in 2004, he was appointed by Governor Jeb Bush to serve on the Lake County School Board, and he was re-elected to that position in 2006. During his second term, he served two consecutive years as chairman of the board.

Florida House of Representatives
In 2010, when Hays ran for the Florida State Senate rather than seeking re-election, Metz ran in the 25th District once again to succeed him. He narrowly won the Republican primary against Rick Joyce with 53% of the vote. In the general election, he faced Frank Layne Wood, the Democratic nominee. The Orlando Sentinel endorsed Wood over Metz, noting that, "Mr. Metz wavers on SunRail, which the Legislature might see again. And he hasn't ruled out expanding offshore drilling or watering down oversight of growth." However, Metz defeated Wood in a landslide, receiving 64% of the vote.

When Florida House of Representatives districts were reconfigured in 2012, Metz was drawn into the 32nd District, which included only a small portion of the territory that he had previously represented in the 25th District. He was unopposed in both the primary and the general election, and won his second term unopposed. In 2014, Metz was re-elected to his third term unopposed, as well.

While in the legislature, he sponsored legislation that targeted the Florida High School Athletic Association, which would "curtail the FHSAA's power to investigate and make athletic eligibility rulings, revamp its governance structure with the addition of more political appointees, and set a 2017 expiration date on its status as the designated governing body for high school sports."

Judicial service 
On March 11, 2018, Governor Rick Scott announced he was appointing Metz to the Fifth Judicial Circuit Court, which covers Citrus, Hernando, Lake, Marion, and Sumter Counties in Central Florida. Metz took office July 1, 2018. He replaced William G. Law.

September 23, 2022 - After weighing and delaying a plea deal for five months, a judge Thursday agreed to sentence Heather Finley to four years in prison for causing a 2018 crash that claimed the lives of four young mothers.

The heartbroken victims’ families were outraged.

“Four years for four lives!” Natalya Davis said in her comments to Circuit Judge Larry Metz.

See also 
 Florida House of Representatives

References

External links
Florida House of Representatives - Larry Metz (archived)
Florida House of Representatives - Larry Metz (non-archived)

|-

|-

1955 births
Living people
Republican Party members of the Florida House of Representatives
21st-century American politicians
Florida State University College of Law alumni